Galina Ivanovna Ustvolskaya (17 June 1919 – 22 December 2006), was a Russian composer of classical music.

Early years
Born in Petrograd, Ustvolskaya studied from 1937 to 1939 at the college attached to the Leningrad Conservatory (later renamed the Rimsky-Korsakov Conservatory). From 1947 till 1977 she taught composition at this college. In 1939 she entered Dmitri Shostakovich's composition class at the Conservatory as the only female student in his class. Her composition teacher said of her:

Shostakovich sent some of his own as yet unfinished works to Ustvolskaya, attaching great value to her comments. Some of these pieces contain quotations from his pupil's compositions; for example, he employed the second theme of the Finale of her clarinet trio throughout the Fifth String Quartet and in the Michelangelo Suite (no. 9). 

Ustvolskaya was a pupil of Shostakovich from 1939 to 1941 and from 1947 to 1948, but her works from the 1950s onwards retain little influence of his style. Until 1961 none of her true works were performed other than patriotic pieces written for official consumption. The middle of the 1960s witnessed greater tolerance for modernist music, and interest in Ustvolskaya began to grow – the Leningrad Union of Composers organized in the 1970s evenings of her music, which received high praise from listeners and critics. Widespread recognition came after her music was performed in several concerts of the 1989 Holland Festival.

Style
Among its characteristics are the use of repeated, homophonic blocks of sound -- which prompted the Dutch critic Elmer Schönberger to call her "the lady with the hammer" -- unusual combinations of instruments (such as eight double basses, piano and percussion in her Composition No. 2); use of extreme dynamics (as in her Piano Sonata No. 6); the employment of groups of instruments to introduce tone clusters; sparse harmonic textures; and the use of piano or percussion to beat out unchanging rhythms.

The music of Galina Ustvolskaya was not openly censured in the USSR. However, she was accused of being unwilling to communicate and of "narrowness" and "obstinacy".

In literature
Ustvolskaya's relationship with Shostakovich from her time as a student through the 1950s is fictionalized in William T. Vollmann's National Book Award-winning historical novel Europe Central.

Legacy and remembrance
Ustvolskaya died in Saint Petersburg. Her manuscripts are stored in the archive of the Paul Sacher Stiftung  since 1994.

Works

Ustvolskaya's oeuvre is small, with only 21 pieces in her characteristic style (i.e. excluding the public, Soviet-style works).

Concerto for piano, full string orchestra and timpani (1946)
Sonata for cello and piano (1946) (destroyed)
Piano Sonata No. 1 (1947)
The Dream of Stepan Razin (Сон Степана Разина – Son Stepana Razina) Bylina for bass and symphony orchestra (Russian folk text, 1949)
Trio for clarinet, violin and piano (1949)
Piano Sonata No. 2 (1949)
Octet for two oboes, four violins, timpani and piano (1950)
Sinfonietta (1951) (destroyed)
Piano Sonata No. 3 (1952)
Violin Sonata (1952)
Twelve Preludes for piano (1953)
Symphony No. 1, for two boys' voices and orchestra (Text by Gianni Rodari, 1955)
Suite for orchestra (1955)
Piano Sonata No. 4 (1957)
Symphonic Poem No. 1 (1959)
Symphonic Poem No. 2 (1957)
Grand Duet for piano and cello (1959)
Duet for piano and violin (1964)
Composition No. 1 Dona Nobis Pacem, for piccolo, tuba and piano (1971)
Composition No. 2 Dies Irae, for eight double basses, piano and wooden cube (1973)
Composition No. 3 Benedictus, Qui Venit, for four flutes, four bassoons and piano (1975)
Symphony No. 2 - True and Eternal Bliss!, for male reciter and small orchestra (1979)
Symphony No. 3 - Jesus Messiah, Save Us!, for male reciter and small orchestra (1983)
Symphony No. 4 - Prayer, for contralto, piano, trumpet and tam-tam (1985/7)
 Piano Sonata No. 5 (1986)
 Piano Sonata No. 6 (1988)
Symphony No. 5 - Amen, for male reciter, oboe, trumpet, tuba, violin and wooden cube (1989/90)

Discography
Composition No. 1
– Zoon / Oostendorp / Malov RN (Radio Netherlands)
– Renggli / Le Clair / Schroeder Hat Art CD 6130
– Tokarev / Arbuszov / Malov Megadisc MDC 7867
– Members of the Schönberg Ensemble / de Leeuw* Philips 442 532-2
– Osten/ Hilgers / Hagen Koch 31 170-2 H1

Composition No. 2
– Propischin / Kolosov / Goryachev / Vulik / Kovulenko / Peresipkin / Sokolov / Nefedov / Javmertchik / Sandovskaya / Malov Megadisc MDC 7867, Megadisc MDC 7858
– Schönberg Ensemble / de Leeuw* Philips 442 532-2

Composition No. 3
– Amsterdam Wind Ensemble / Friesen  RN (Radio Netherlands) Globe 6903
– Danilina / Osipova / Rodina / Tokarev / Makarov / Shevchuk / Sokolov / Krasnik / Sandovskaya / Malov Megadisc MDC 7867
– Schönberg Ensemble / de Leeuw*  Philips 442 532-2
– Jones / Coffin / Keen / Stevenson / O’Neill / Antcliffe / Newman / McNaughton / Stephenson / Stephenson Conifer 75605 51 194-2

Concerto for Piano, String Orchestra and Timpani
– Lubimov / Deutsche Kammerphilharmonie / Schiff Erato 0630 12 709-2
– Seribryakov / Chamber Orchestra of the Leningrad Philharmonic / Malov. Musica Non Grata Series. Melodiya BMG 74321 49 956-2

Duet for Violin and Piano
– Beths / de Leeuw* Hat Art CD 6115
– Shustin / Malov Megadisc MDC 7863
– Rissin / Rissin-Morenova SST 30211

Grand Duet for Violoncello and Piano
– Stolpner / Malov ... (LP) Melodia C10 23283 007, Musica Non Grata Series. Melodiya BMG 74321 49 956-2
– Vassiliev / Malov Megadisc MDC 7863
– Uitti / Malov  RN (Radio Netherlands)
– Kooistra / Denyer* Etcetera KTC 1170
– de Saram / Schroeder Hat Art CD 6130
– Beiser / Oldfather Koch 37 301-2 H1
– Rostropovich / Lubimov EMI 572016-2 *Ustvolskaya’s preferred recording

Octet for 2 Oboes, 4 Violins, Timpani and Piano
– Kossoyan / Tchinakov / Stang / Liskovich / Dukor / Soakov / Snamenski / Karandashova (LP) Melodia C10 0 715 152 Musica Non Grata Series. Melodiya BMG 74321 49 956-2
– Neretin / Tosenko / Stang / Ritalchenko / Lukin / Tkachenko / Znamenskii / Malov  Megadisc MDC 7865
– Bohling / Tindale / Fletcher / Muszaros / Tombling /Iwabucchi / Cole / Stephenson* Conifer 75605 51 194-2

Piano Sonata
– Malov / Liss / Ural Philharmonic Orchestra (CD) Megadisc MDC 7856 (2000)

Sonata for Piano No. 1
– Malov(LP) Melodia C10 23 283 007, Megadisc MDC 7876
– Denyer*  Conifer 75605 51 262-2
– Schroeder HEK Hat 6170
– Hinterhäuser COL Legno WWE 20019

Sonata for Piano No. 2
– Malov Megadisc MDC 7876, Megadisc MDC 7858
– Denyer Conifer 75605 51 262-2
– Vedernikov* Teichiku TECC – 28170
– Schroeder HEK HAT 6170
– Hinterhäuser  COL Legno WWE 20019

Sonata for Piano No. 3
– Malov Melodia C10 0715 152 (LP), Megadisc MDC 7876, Musica Non Grata Series. Melodiya BMG 74321 49 956-2
– Denyer* Conifer 75605 51 262-2
– Karlen ECM 449936-2
– Schroeder HEK Hat 6170
– Hinterhäuser COL Legno WWE 20019

Sonata for Piano No. 4
– Malov (LP) Melodia C10 23283 007, Megadisc MDC 7876
– Denyer* Conifer 75605 51 262-2
– Varsi Mediaphon 72. 158
– Schroeder HEK Hat 6170
– Hinterhäuser  COL Legno WWE 20019

Sonata for Piano No. 5
– de Leeuw* Hat Art CD 6115
– Denyer Etcetera KTC 1170, Conifer 75605 51 262-2
– Malov Megadisc MDC 7876, MEGADISC MDC 7858
– de Leeuw WD 02 (Wittener Tage für neue Kammermusik)
– Karlen ECM 449 936-2
– Schroeder HEK Hat 6170
– Hinterhäuser COL Legno WWE 20019

Sonata for Piano No. 6
– Malov Megadisc MDC 7876 Megadisc MDC 8000
– Denyer* Conifer 75605 51 262-2
– Mukaiyama BVHAAST CD 9406
– Arden Koch 37 301-2 H1, KOCH 37 603-2 H1
– Schroeder HEK Hat 6170
– Hinterhäuser COL Legno WWE 20019

Sonata for Violin and Piano
– Shustin / Malov Megadisc MDC 7865
– Rissin / Rissin-Morenova SST 30211

Symphony No. 1
– Malov / Liss / Ural Philharmonic Orchestra (CD) Megadisc MDC 7856 (2000)

Symphony No. 2 – True and Eternal Bliss
– The St. Petersburg Soloists / Malov / Liss  Megadisc MDC 7858

Symphony No. 3 – Jesus Messiah, Save Us!
– The St. Petersburg Soloists / Malov / Liss Megadisc MDC 7858
– Symphonieorchester des Bayerische n Rundfunks / Stenz / Sherstanoi Megadisc MDC 7858

Symphony No. 4 – Prayer
– van Vliet / Konink / Denyer / Meeuwsen Etcetera KTC 1170, Megadisc MDC 8000
– Marrs / Keemss / Miller / Sperber Mediaphon MED 72 115
– The St. Petersburg Soloists / Malov / Liss Megadisc MDC 7858

Symphony No. 5 – Anen
– Leiferkus / Fletcher / Bohling / Hultmark / Powell / Cole / Stephenson  CONIFER 75605 51 194-2
– The St. Petersburg Soloists / Malov / Liss MEGADISC MDC 7858

Twelve Preludes for Piano
– Schroeder Hat Art CD 6130
– Malov Megadisc MDC 7867
– Arden* Koch 37 301-2 H1

Trio for Clarinet, Violin and Piano
– Beths / de Boer / de Leeuw* Hat Art CD 6115
– Keser / Anderson / Denyer* Etcetera KTC 1170
– Shustin / Feodorov / Malov Megadisc MDC 7865

References

Viktor Suslin: The music of Spiritual Independence: Galina Ustvolskaya in «Ex oriente...I» Ten Composers from the former USSR. Viktor Suslin, Dmitri Smirnov, Arvo Pärt, Yury Kasparov, Galina Ustvolskaya, Nikolai Sidelnikov, Elena Firsova Vladimir Martynov, Andrei Eshpai, Boris Chaikovsky. Edited by Valeria Tsenova (studia slavica musicologica, Bd. 25), Verlag Ernst Kuhn – Berlin.  pp. 207–266 (in English)
Lemaire, Frans. Notes to Symphonies 2,3,4 and 5. Megadisc MDC 7854.
Simon Bokman. Variations on the Theme Galina Ustvolskaya. Translated by Irina Behrendt. (studia slavica musicologica, Bd.40), Verlag Ernst Kuhn - Berlin,2007.  (in English)
Rachel Jeremiah-Foulds: 'An Extraordinary Relationship and Acrimonious Split - Galina Ustvolskaya and Dmitri Shostakovich' in Mitteilungen der Paul Sacher Stiftung, No. 23, April 2010.
Rachel Jeremiah-Foulds: 'Spiritual Independence or a Cultural Norm? Galina Ustvolskaya and the Znamenny Raspev' in Church, State and Nation in Orthodox Church Music, Proceedings of the Third International Conference on Orthodox Church Music, University of Joensuu, Finland - 8–14 June 2009.

External links
Official site

Music under Soviet Rule:The Lady With The Hammer

1919 births
2006 deaths
20th-century classical composers
Russian women classical composers
Russian classical composers
Soviet classical composers
Soviet composers
Soviet women classical composers
Soviet women composers
20th-century women composers